The coat of arms of Guyana (Co-operative Republic of Guyana) was granted by the College of Arms on 25 February 1966.

It includes a crest of an Amerindian head-dress symbolising the indigenous people of the country, this crest is also called the Cacique's Crown; two diamonds at the sides of the head-dress representing mining industry; a helmet; two jaguars as supporters holding a pick axe, sugar cane, and a stalk of rice (symbolising Guyana's mining, sugar and rice industries); a shield decorated with the Victoria amazonica lily, Guyana's national flower; three blue wavy lines representing the three main rivers of Guyana; and the national bird, the Canje Pheasant (Opisthocomus hoazin). The national motto, "One people, One Nation, One Destiny", appears on the scroll below the shield.

British Guiana

Symbolism

The symbolism of the coat of arms of Guyana is as follows:
The Amerindian head-dress, the Cacique Crown, symbolises the Amerindians as the indigenous people of the country.
The two diamonds at the sides of the head-dress represent the country’s mining industry.
The helmet, on which the Cacique Crown rests, is the monarchical insignia.
The two jaguars rampant, holding a pick-axe, a sugar cane, and a stalk of rice, symbolise labour and the two main agricultural industries of the country, sugar and rice.
The shield, which is decorated with the national flower, the Victoria Regia Lily, is to protect the nation.
The three blue wavy barrulets represent the three great rivers and many waters of Guyana.
The Canje Pheasant at the bottom of the shield is a rare bird found principally in this part of the world and represents the rich fauna of Guyana.

See also
 Flag of Guyana
 Postage stamps and postal history of British Guiana

References

National symbols of Guyana
Guyana
Guyana
Guyana
Guyana
Guyana
Guyana
Guyana
Guyana
Guyana